Colfin railway station, located in Wigtownshire, Scotland, between Portpatrick and Stranraer, was a station on the Portpatrick and Wigtownshire Joint Railway. Opened on 28 August 1862, when the extension of the line from Stranraer to Portpatrick was put in service, it was closed on 6 February 1950, though freight service between Colfin and Stranraer continued until 1 April 1959, serving the Colfin Creamery, which had been built in proximity to the station.

Route

References

External links
 Canmore site record, Royal Commission on the Ancient and Historical Monuments of Scotland

Disused railway stations in Dumfries and Galloway
Former Portpatrick and Wigtownshire Joint Railway stations
Railway stations in Great Britain opened in 1862
Railway stations in Great Britain closed in 1950
1862 establishments in Scotland
1950 disestablishments in Scotland